Project 562 is a photography project by Matika Wilbur, in which the artist is documenting and depicting at least one contemporary Native American person from each of the 562 currently recognized Tribal Nations in the United States.

Description 
Project 562 began in 2012 as a photographic documentary focusing on Indigenous American tribal members. The name is derived from the 562 federally recognized tribes in the United States at the time of the project's conception in 2012. As of 2018 the number of federally recognized tribes in the US has increased to 567.

The artist herself, Matika Wilbur, is a member of both the Swinomish and Tulalip Nations in Washington State. Wilbur describes the project as "[addressing and remedying] historical inaccuracies, stereotypical representations, and absence of Native American images and voices in mass media and the national consciousness".

The concept of a "vanishing race" was originally introduced by Edward S. Curtis in the early 1900s to document Native American people before their communities and cultures disappeared.  Wilbur describes Project 562 as engaging with Curtis' work. In an interview with The New York Times, Wilbur said, "I can see the importance of Curtis' work, but the inaccuracy of how we are portrayed just doesn't seem fair." As of August 2015, Wilbur has documented roughly 300 tribes as a part of Project 562. She hopes to complete her work by 2016.

Partners and affiliates 
Additional Team Members:
 Jessica Harjo, San Carlos Apache
 Marlon Footracer, Diné from Tsé Síaní (Lupton, Arizona)
 Bethany Yellowtail, member of Apsaalooke and Northern Cheyenne nations.
 Deidra Peaches, Navajo

Funding 
Wilbur launched her first Kickstarter campaign to pay for her travels. She raised $35,000. Her second Kickstarter campaign resulted in $54,ooo of additional funds to continue her journey. In addition to these funds, which served "almost solely as gas and film" money, she relied heavily on the support of tribes she visited whom "fed her, housed her, and prayed with her".

Influence 
Wilbur's work on Project 562 has been featured in The Guardian, and O, The Oprah Magazine. In 2014, Wilbur gave a talk about Project 562 at a TED conference. In her interview with The Guardian, Wilbur said "I'm ultimately doing this because our perception matters ... Our perception fuels racism. It fuels segregation. Our perception determines the way we treat each other."  In a TEDx Talk Wilbur gave in 2014, she describes how indigenous Americans are portrayed within mass media citing that between 1990 and 2000 there were 5,868 blockbuster release films of which:

Exhibitions 
The exhibition of Project 562, titled Photographic Presence and Contemporary Indians: Matika Wilbur's Project 562, featuring 40 of Wilbur's Native American portraits, as well as audio narratives from select sitters debuted at the Tacoma Art Museum, and ran May 17 through October 5, 2014. On October 23, 2015, Project 562 went on display as a main feature at the Hibulb Cultural Center in Tulalip, Washington.

References 

Projects established in 2012
Native American studies